Leila Toubel (Arabic: ليلى طوبال ) is a Tunisian activist, author, actress and playwright.

She is considered one of the leading figures of Tunisian theater.

Life 
Originally from Hammam Lif, Leila Toubel wrote poems and short stories from an early age. From the age of thirteen, she did theater in school, and attended performances by the troupe of Aly Ben Ayed. During an audition at the Arab-African International Training Center of the El Hamra Theater in Tunis, in 1990, his meeting with Ezzedine Gannoun launched her professional career. Gannoun directs the El Hamra theater with, among others, Toubel.

Between 2000 and 2010, she took an artistic break, Toubel indicated that she needed to understand who she was and what she could be on stage.

From 2011 to 2012, she directed the Boukornine International Festival; but in June 2013, she resigned in protest to the pressures of the League for the Protection of the Revolution. In June 2014, after 25 years in the El Hamra theatre, Leila Toubel left her post.

In August 2017, Leila Toubel was a member of the jury of the Kelibia International Amateur Film Festival in the “international competition” section.

On 13 August 2022, she retired from the stage as an actress after performing Yakouta, at the Carthage International Festival. However, she continued to write and support young artists through her project Dream's Chebeb.

Works 

 1998-1999 : Je laisse une trace
 2006-2007 : Otages (رهائن), mise en scène of Ezzedine Gannoun
 2009-2010 : The End (آخر ساعة), mise en scène  of Ezzedine Gannoun
 2012-2014 : Monstranum's, (غيلان), mise en scène of Ezzedine Gannoun
 2015-2016 : Solwen (سُلْوَانْ)
 2016-2017 : Hourya (حورية)
 2021 : Yakouta (ياقوتة)

References 

Living people
Year of birth missing (living people)
People from Ben Arous Governorate
Tunisian theatre people
21st-century dramatists and playwrights
Women dramatists and playwrights